André Vanderstappen (27 March 1934 – 14 June 2005) was a Belgian footballer. He played in ten matches for the Belgium national football team from 1957 to 1959.

References

External links
 

1934 births
2005 deaths
Belgian footballers
Belgium international footballers
Place of birth missing
Association footballers not categorized by position